Gray Hill is a mountain in Sullivan County, New York. It is located southwest of Grooville. Rattle Hill is located north-northeast and Round Top is located southwest of Gray Hill.

References

Mountains of Sullivan County, New York
Mountains of New York (state)